Siswa may refer to:

Siswa, Araria, a village in Araria district, Bihar, India
Siswa, East Champaran, a village in East Champaran district, Bihar, India
Siswa, Purnia, a village in Purnia district, Bihar, India
Siswa River, a river and valley in Sankhuwasabha District, Nepal

See also
Siswa Bazar